"Now That I'm On My Own" is a song recorded by Canadian country music group Farmer's Daughter. It was released in 1997 as the third single from their second studio album, Makin' Hay. It peaked at number 10 on the RPM Country Tracks chart in July 1997.

Chart performance

Year-end charts

References

1996 songs
1997 singles
Farmer's Daughter songs
MCA Records singles
Songs written by Darrell Scott